The Third Quartet is an album by guitarist John Abercrombie featuring violinist Mark Feldman, acoustic bassist Marc Johnson and drummer Joey Baron that was recorded in 2006 and released by ECM in 2007.

Reception
The Allmusic review by Thom Jurek awarded the album 4 stars, stating, "Third Quartet is the third album by this rather astonishing group of musicians under guitarist and composer John Abercrombie's leadership. His collaborators: drummer Joey Baron, violinist Mark Feldman, and bassist Marc Johnson are all accomplished leaders in their own rights, but as they team with Abercrombie, something unusual, unwieldy, and utterly transformative takes place... This is a most welcome and beautiful addition to this particular group's musical language as well as their catalog".
The Penguin Guide to Jazz awarded it a "Crown" in addition to a four-star rating.

Track listing

Personnel
 John Abercrombie – guitar
 Mark Feldman – violin
 Marc Johnson – double bass
 Joey Baron – drums

References

ECM Records albums
John Abercrombie (guitarist) albums
2007 albums
Albums produced by Manfred Eicher